Tamalika Karmakar (born 2 July) is a Bangladeshi actress and model. Her notable film roles were in Ei Ghar Ei Songshar (1996), Kittonkhola (2000) and Ghetuputra Komola (2012). Tamalika won Bangladesh National Film Award for Best Supporting Actress for her role in Kittonkhola. In July 2017, she performed, with Aranyak Nattaydal theatre troupe, in Rarang, on their 180th rendition.

Early life
Karmakar was born on 2 July. She started acting at the age of 3. Gowhor Jamil, folk and classical dancer, was her dance teacher.

Career 
Karmakar has been associated with the theater group Aranyak Nattaydal since January 1992. She debuted in the theater play Pathor, written and produced by Mamunur Rashid and Azizul Hakim. She went on to play other plays including Khela Khela, Iblish, Prakritojon and Joyjointhi.

Works

Films

Television dramas

Stage plays

Awards
 Bangladesh National Film Award for Best Supporting Actress 
National Film Awards is the most prominent film award ceremony in Bangladesh. Established in 1975 by Government of Bangladesh. This is the only film awards given to the Government of Bangladesh. Tamalika Karmakar received this Award for Best Supporting Actress for movie Kittonkhola in 2000 directed by Abu Sayeed.
 Mega Start Music and Entertainment award 2016 
Tamalika Karmakar got Mega Start Music and Entertainment award in recognition of her outstanding and continuous achievement in acting and theater Performance organized by Mega Start Music & Entertainment 2 October 2016.
 International Theatre Festival of Kerala (ITFOK) 2008  
International Theatre Festival of Kerala (ITFOK) is an international theatre festival held every year in December in Thrissur city of Kerala State, India. The festival is organized by Kerala Sangeetha Nataka Academy and Cultural Department of Government of Kerala. The festival was started in 2008. This was given to Tamalika Karmakar as a memorandum in International Theater Festival of Kerala 2008
 Television Dorshok Forum of Bangladesh (TDFBD) (2005)
Television Dorshok Forum of Bangladesh (TDFBD) is the community for award giving of the Various Television Program by the voting of the Viewers of Bangladesh. It also gives life time awards to various celebrities. Tamalika Karmakar received this award as best actress in 2005.
 Ekota Performance Award 2004 
Ekota Performance Award is given by Ekota Cultural and Social Organization. Every year they arrange a program to honor best artists all over the country. Tamalika Karmakar received that award as best actress of drama in 2004.

 DPL Media City Showbiz Award (2010)  
Tamalika won the Award for best actress in stage by DPL Media City Showbiz Award in 2010. This award is arranged By Dhaka Cultural Reporters Unity

 Ekota Samajik Sangskritik Sangstha Award (2002) 
Tamalika Karmakar received Ekota Samajik Sangskritik Sangstha honor for her remarkable acting in Bangla telefilm Kurukkhetro, this is the certificate of this award given at 2002
 BTV Child Artist Award (Nutun Kuri) 1982 
In 1982 Tamalika Karmakar again received Bangladesh National Television Child Artist Award (Nutun Kuri) in the category of story telling. This awards was just the beginning of her colourful Career.
 International Pen-Palls Club Award (1989) 
Tamalika Karmakar Received International Pen-Palls Club Award in 1989 for bring up the Heroic acts of the myrters in 1971 libaration war to the children.
 Aronnok Natto Dol Award 
She won the honorable medal from Aronnok Natto Dol in their 50th stage show. Aronnok is a prominent theater group in Bangladesh.
 Bornochora Natto Goshthi Award  
Tamalika Karmakar got the Bornochora Natto Goshthi Award in their 32 years anniversary. Bornochora Natto Goshthi is a very old theater and performance group in Bangladesh.
 Shibli Award by Dhaka Theatre
Dhaka Theater had given Tamalika Karmakar Faojia Yasmin Shibli Podok in Shelim al Din Jonmoutshob 2008 for her extraordinary talent and performance in theater for this long years.
 North American Bangladesh Cultural Society Award
Honorary Award from the North American Bangladesh Cultural Society.

References

External links

Living people
Bengali Hindus
Bangladeshi Hindus
Bangladeshi stage actresses
Bangladeshi television actresses
Bangladeshi film actresses
Best Supporting Actress National Film Award (Bangladesh) winners
Year of birth missing (living people)
Place of birth missing (living people)